Iprazochrome is an antimigraine agent used for prophylaxis of the attacks. It is also indicated for diabetic retinopathy (both treatment and prevention in people with type-2 diabetes).

Chemically, it is a derivative of adrenochrome, which is a product of adrenaline oxidation.

Mechanism of action 
It is a serotonin antagonist both in vitro and in vivo (it is a 5-HT2D receptor antagonist). It also neutralises other vasoactive compounds such as bradykinin, histamine, and others.

This drug decreases the permeability and fragility of blood vessels, which reduces the number of migraine days and attenuates the symptoms associated with this condition, but it does not eliminate them altogether.

In animal models, iprazochrome was shown not to decrease the spreading depression velocity, which is a feature of other antimigraine agents and is thought to be one of the essential causes of classical migraines.

Dose 
For migraines, 1-3 tabletes (each tablet contains 2.5 mg of iprazochrome) are taken three times a day. An abortive medication is recommended in the first weeks of treatment.

For diabetic retinopaty, 2 tablets are taken three times a day. If the initial treatment was successful, it can be reduced to 1 tablet three times a day.

The effect of this medication is usually seen after a month. Its achieves its full efficacy after 3 months of treatment.

Side effects 
It can work as an anorectic and can cause skin allergic reactions after dicontinuing.

This drug was also shown to induce pain in patients with atypical facial pain.

Pharmacokinetics

Absorption 
After taking the drug on empty stomach, it is rapidly absorbed. Peak serum concentration (Cmax) is achieved after 1 hour, but its effect on blood vessels is seen only after 3 hours.

Elimination 
The half-life of iprazochrome is 2.2 hours. It is metabolised renally and 20% is eliminated in an unchanged form.

There are two known metabolites of iprazochrome: an indole derivative (detected in urine) and a 6-hydroxy derivative (detected in feces).

References 

Antimigraine drugs
Semicarbazones
Indolines
Secondary alcohols
Isopropyl compounds